Miss Curaçao (In Papiamentu: Miss Kòrsou) is a national beauty pageant in Curaçao. This pageant is unrelated to the Señorita Curaçao or Miss International Curaçao pageant.

History
The pageant started in 1963 and sends contestants to the Miss World and Miss Universe pageants. The organization started with the creation of the Curaçao Youth Beauty Contest Organization (CYBECO).

Between 1997 and 2006 Sheida Wever, former Miss Curaçao 1985 who went to compete to the Miss Universe pageant that same year, organized the national pageant and was the national director for both Miss World and Miss Universe.
 
In 2006, Reinilla Productions Developments (ReProD) obtained the Miss World, Miss Intercontinental, Top Model of the World and Miss Earth franchise for Curaçao. Their first delegate was Fyrena Martha who competed in Miss World 2006 in Poland. In 2007 and 2008, ReProD in association with Sanjess Promotions held a joint pageant where the Miss Universe and Miss World representative were selected. Since 2009 the event is independent to Miss Universe Curaçao.

Since 2006, the Curaçao Tourism Board holds the Miss Universe franchise and every year they have a bidding to choose who is going to organize the Miss Curaçao Universe pageant, Sanjess Promotions run by Jearmeane Colastica organized it in 2007 and 2008.

Smaller pageants had been held to select contestants to Miss International, until 2002 by Richard Isa.

In 2008, the Curaçao Beauty Organization presided by Aubrey America won the bid to organize the pageant jointly with Hart & Private Productions. The winner of Miss Universe Curaçao represents the island in Miss Universe.

In 2011, Evalina van Putten won Reina Hispanoamericana 2011 in Bolivia. This was first time Curaçao winning the title.

In 2013, after a long time of speculating about the Miss Universe Curaçao pageant, Coridja Stars Productions got the license to organize the most important pageant of the island.

In 2018 the Curaçao Beauty Pageant Committee took the franchise of Miss Universe, together with Miss World, Miss International and Miss Earth.

Miss Universe license holder in Curaçao
Curaçao Youth Beauty Contest Organization (CYBECO) (1963—1984)
Curaçao Youth Beauty Contest Organization (CYBECO), under Richard John Isa (1985—1996)
Sheida Wever (1997—2005)
Curacao Tourism Board (2006) 
Sanjess Promotion, under Jearmeane Colastica (2007) 
Curacao Beauty, under Aubrey America (2008—2012)
Coridja Stars Productions, under Corinne Djaoen-Genaro (2013—2017)
Curacao BP Committee, under Ayshel Maria (2018—present)

Titleholders

Titleholders under Miss Curaçao org.

Miss Universe Curaçao

Since 1963 traditionally the winner of Miss Universe Curaçao represents her country at Miss Universe. On occasion, when the winner does not qualify (due to age) for either contest, a runner-up is sent. Curaçao had sent contestants to Miss Universe since 1963 with Philomena Zielinki, the second Miss Curaçao. Of all the 48 representatives from the island, 7 of them have placed in the semifinals.

References

External links
 coridjastars.com
 Miss Curaçao Official

Beauty pageants in Curaçao
Dutch awards
1962 establishments in the Netherlands Antilles
Recurring events established in 1962
Curacao